Karimi (کریمی), a Persian surname of a once famous merchant clan from Karima (کریمه). It is also derived from the Arabic name Kareem for people of Arab descent. It may refer to:

Sports
Abbas Karimi (swimmer), Afghan swimmer
Ali Karimi (disambiguation), several Iranian footballers
Farshid Karimi, Iranian football goalkeeper
Mahmoud Karimi Sibaki, Iranian football striker
Ali Karimi (Tabriz), Iranian footballer
Firouz Karimi, Iranian football manager
Obaidullah Karimi, Afghan footballer

Art
Niki Karimi, Iranian actress and movie director
Nosrat Karimi, Iranian actor, director, make-up artist, University professor, scriptwriter and sculptor
Reza Karimi, Iranian fine artist, water color painter
Sahraa Karimi, Afghan film director
Mandana Karimi, Model, Bollywood actress

Politics
Farah Karimi, Iranian-Dutch politician
Mehran Karimi Nasseri, Iranian refugee who lived in the departure lounge of Terminal One in Charles de Gaulle Airport
Jamal Karimi-Rad, Minister of Justice of the Islamic Republic of Iran
Sher Mohammad Karimi, Afghan general and Chief of Army Staff

Others
Karimis, an Islamic capitalist group during the 11th–13th centuries
Ahmad Karimi-Hakkak, Persian literary figure and Iranist Soran Karimi

Iranian-language surnames
Patronymic surnames
Surnames from given names